David Hilton Breakwell (born 16 June 1946) is a former English cricketer.  Ranells was a right-handed batsman who bowled right-arm fast-medium.  He was born in Bridgnorth, Shropshire, and educated at Bridgnorth Grammar School.

Breakwell made his debut for Shropshire in the 1964 Minor Counties Championship against the Warwickshire Second XI.  Breakwell played Minor counties cricket for Shropshire from 1964 to 1978, which included 47 Minor Counties Championship appearances.  He made his List A debut against Essex in the 1974 Gillette Cup.  In this match, took 2 wickets for the cost of 34 runs from 12 overs.  He made a further List A appearance against Yorkshire in the 1976 Gillette Cup.  He took 3 wickets for the cost of 28 runs from 11.1 overs.

References

External links
David Breakwell at ESPNcricinfo
David Breakwell at CricketArchive

1946 births
Living people
People from Bridgnorth
English cricketers
Shropshire cricketers